Snowdrift Lake is located in Grand Teton National Park, in the U. S. state of Wyoming. Snowdrift Lake is one of the highest altitude lakes in Grand Teton National Park.

References

Lakes of Grand Teton National Park